Demon hunter is a demonology-related historic occupation or folkloric character which specializes in demons, angels, monsters, or undead creatures.

Demon hunter or variations may also refer to:

Characters
 Demon Hunter (comics), an Atlas/Seaboard Comics character
 Demon Hunters, a character class in the video game World of Warcraft: Legion

Gaming
 Demon Hunters Role Playing Game, a 2008 role-playing game by Margaret Weis Productions
 Akaneiro: Demon Hunters, a 2012 dark fantasy video game by Spicy Horse

Literature
 Queen Victoria: Demon Hunter, a 2009 novel by A. E. Moorat
 Yamada Monogatari: Demon Hunter, a 2013 collection of historical mystery fantasy short stories by Richard Parks

Music
 Demon Hunter, an American Christian metal band
 Demon Hunter (album), 2002

Other uses
 Demon Hunter (film), a 2005 action/horror film

See also
 Devil Hunter (disambiguation)